Nénette and Boni is a 1996 French drama film directed by Claire Denis, written by Denis in collaboration with Jean-Pol Fargeau.

Plot
After the death of his mother, Boni (Grégoire Colin) moves his friends into her house and begins working selling pizzas. He entertains violent sexual fantasies about a baker (Valeria Bruni Tedeschi) who lives nearby. He is visited by his younger sister Nénette (Alice Houri), whom he is estranged from, who reveals that she is pregnant and moves into his home against his wishes.

Reluctantly, Boni begins to take his sister to doctor's appointments where they learn it is too late for her to have an abortion. As Boni gradually warms to the idea of being an uncle, Nénette looks into having a Jane Doe birth which will allow her to give birth anonymously and have the child adopted immediately. However, after Boni insults her for considering the option she attempts to abort the child at home, passing out before being rescued by Boni.

At the hospital Nénette bans Boni from the birth of her child, but he returns later, armed with a gun, and kidnaps his nephew, bringing him home to take care of him.

Cast

Release
The film had its world premiere at the 1996 Locarno Festival. It was released in France on 29 January 1997 on 41 screens and grossed $145,920 in its opening week, opening at 14th at the French box office. The soundtrack to the film, created by Tindersticks, was released in 1996.

Reception

Critical response
On review aggregator website Rotten Tomatoes, the film holds an approval rating of 85% based on 13 reviews, with a weighted average rating of 7.3/10. On Metacritic, the film has a weighted average score of 70 out of 100, based on 10 critics, indicating "generally favorable reviews".

Roger Ebert gave the film 3 out of 4 stars, calling it "one of those movies that is saturated with sensuality but not with explicit detail." Derek Elley of Variety wrote, "In a change of tack from her previous pics, Denis adopts a patchwork of styles that gives the movie an irreal, highly metaphysical flavor."

Accolades

References

External links
 

1996 films
1990s French-language films
1996 drama films
Films directed by Claire Denis
Golden Leopard winners
French drama films
Films about abortion
Films about siblings
1990s French films
Films scored by Tindersticks